Sean Christopher Stone (born December 29, 1984) is an American actor, filmmaker, and television host. Stone hosted a show on the Russian state-funded network RT America until the network was shut down in 2022 after Russia's invasion of Ukraine 

In his last episode on RT America, Stone criticized celebrities for speaking out against Russia's invasion, and claimed that Oprah Winfrey had banned Tolstoy's War and Peace from her book club, and said it was wrong to characterize Russian leader Vladimir Putin as "some kind of dictator."

Biography 

Stone was born in New York City. He is the son of Elizabeth Burkit Cox and film director Oliver Stone and has appeared in several of his father's films. His paternal grandmother was French.

A convert to Shia Islam in 2012, in an interview with CNN, Stone said that he accepted Muhammad as the seal of the prophets. Speaking to Bill O'Reilly, he claimed Iranian President Mahmoud Ahmadinejad's statements about Israel had been misunderstood.

Stone is a member of the Board of Advisors for the company MindShare Ventures Group based in New York City.

Filmography

Actor

Salvador (1986) as Boyle's Baby 
Wall Street (1987) as Rudy Gekko 
Born on the Fourth of July (1989) as Young Jimmy Kovic
JFK (1991) as Jasper Garrison 
The Doors (1991) as Young Jim Morrison
Heaven & Earth (1993)Natural Born Killers (1994) as Kevin Nixon (1995) as Donald NixonU Turn (1997)Any Given Sunday (1999)Fighting Against Time: Oliver Stone's Alexander (2005) himself as narratorResurrecting Alexander (2005) himself as narratorPerfect Is the Enemy of Good (2005) as narratorW. (2008)Wall Street: Money Never Sleeps (2010)Nevo (2011) as Stephan Greystone Park (2011) as Sean American Road (2011) as Jack Kerouac Don't Pass Me By (2012) as Josh MalekNight Walk (2019) as Frank

Director, producer, cinematographer, or screenwriterFighting Against Time: Oliver Stone's Alexander (2005) (as writer, producer, director, cinematographer)The Death of Alexander (2005) (as producer, director, cinematographer)Resurrecting Alexander (2005) (as producer, director, cinematographer)Perfect Is the Enemy of Good (2005) (as producer, director, cinematographer)Nuremberg: A Vision Restored (2007) (as producer, director, cinematographer)Singularity (2008) (as writer, producer, director)Greystone Park (2011) (as writer, director)A Child's Night Dream (upcoming) (as writer, producer, director)A Thousand Pieces'' (2020) (as narrator), Documentary about CIA and FBI corruption.
Greystone Park

References

External links

1984 births
20th-century American male actors
American cinematographers
American film directors
Film producers from New York (state)
American male child actors
American male film actors
American male screenwriters
American people of French descent
American people of Jewish descent
American Shia Muslims
Converts to Shia Islam
Living people
Male actors from New York City
Screenwriters from New York (state)
Converts to Islam
American conspiracy theorists
American television hosts